A coffle was a group of enslaved people chained together and marched from one place to another by owners or slave traders.

History

In the Antebellum South, slave traders such as Franklin and Armfield arbitraged slave prices by purchasing slaves at low prices in Mid-Atlantic states such as Virginia, and then reselling them at a higher price in deep-south, especially in New Orleans, Louisiana and in Natchez, Mississippi at the notorious Forks of the Road Market. Franklin and Armfield established slavepens near Alexandria, Virginia to hold slaves, and when a sufficient number were gathered, some were transported by ship. Others were handcuffed to long chains in groups of 100 ( a coffle) and force marched to the markets of the deep south, where they would be sold as slaves. Their professions were varied as some would be laborers, seamstresses, carpenters and "fancy girls", who would serve as sex slaves.

References

Slavery in the United States
Pre-emancipation African-American history
African diaspora history
African slave trade
African-American cultural history
18th century in the United States
19th century in the United States
Social history of the United States